The first World Cup of Hockey (WCH), or 1996 World Cup of Hockey, replaced the Canada Cup as one of the premier championships for professional ice hockey.

Inaugural World Cup of Hockey
The first edition of the Cup featured eight teams divided into two groups.  The European Group, whose games were all played in Europe, included the Czech Republic, Finland, Germany, and Sweden.  The North American Group played in North American cities and included Canada, Russia, Slovakia, and the United States. Some of the best players in the world were missing in the tournament, some either declined invitation, such as Dominik Hašek stating "I would love to play in (the competition), but the timing is bad", or because of injuries, as Pavel Bure was injured during a Russia-USA exhibition game in Detroit.

After the teams played a three-game group stage, the top team in each group advanced to the semi-finals, while the second and third place teams played cross-over quarter-finals.  The quarter-finals and semi-finals were single elimination games.  The championship final was a best-of-three.  All playoff games were played in North America.

In the biggest surprise of the tournament, Germany defeated Czech Republic 7–1 in the European Group, which eliminated the Czechs and sent the Germans into the quarter-finals.  In the biggest game of the North American Group, USA defeated Canada 5–3 to finish first and get a bye to the semi-finals.  In the semis, they defeated Russia 5–2, while Canada beat Sweden 3–2 on Theoren Fleury's goal at 19:47 of the second overtime period, ending the longest game in international hockey history.

The tournament did see some controversy after the Canada-Russia game in Vancouver was played when Sweden's coach Kent Forsberg said he believed "Canada cheated its way to victory" through help of Canadian NHL referees that saw two goals disallowed and several controversial penalties for Russia.  The Russian's coach Boris Mikhailov echoed a similar sentiment after the game saying "It was the referees' victory", as Team Russia had felt there was "biased officiating".

In the best-of-three final, Canada won the first game, in Philadelphia, 4–3 in overtime.  Then the USA recorded a memorable pair of 5–2 victories in Montreal to win the series.  In the third and decisive game, the US received spectacular goaltending from tournament MVP Mike Richter and rallied from a 2–1 deficit in the third period by scoring four goals in the final 3:18 of the game. Tony Amonte scored the game-winning goal.

Rosters

Venues

North American pool and playoffs
Corel Centre – Ottawa, Canada
CoreStates Center – Philadelphia, U.S.
General Motors Place – Vancouver, Canada
Madison Square Garden – New York City, U.S.
Molson Centre – Montreal, Canada

European pool
Garmisch Olympia Stadium – Garmisch-Partenkirchen, Germany
Globen – Stockholm, Sweden
Helsinki Ice Hall – Helsinki, Finland
Sportovní hala – Prague, Czech Republic

Results

Exhibition Games (incomplete list)
Russia 5–4 Finland (Moscow)
Sweden 2–3 Russia (Stockholm)
Germany 2–4 Russia (Landshut)
Canada 4–4 Russia (Calgary)
United States 4–6 Russia (Detroit) 
United States 1–3 Canada (Vancouver)
Canada 5–7 United States (San Jose)
Slovakia 4–7 Canada (Edmonton)
Slovakia 2–9 United States (Providence)

North American pool

Scores
August 29, Vancouver: Russia 3–5 Canada
August 31, Montreal: Slovakia 4–7 Russia
August 31, Philadelphia: Canada 3–5 United States
September 1, Ottawa: Canada 3–2 Slovakia
September 2, New York City: Russia 2–5 United States
September 3, New York City: United States 9–3 Slovakia

European pool

Scores
August 26, Stockholm: Germany 1–6 Sweden
August 27, Helsinki: Finland 7–3 Czech Republic
August 28, Helsinki: Germany 3–8 Finland
August 29, Prague: Sweden 3–0 Czech Republic
August 31, Garmisch: Czech Republic 1–7 Germany
September 1, Stockholm: Finland 2–5 Sweden

Knockout stage

Quarterfinals
September 5, Montreal: Germany 1–4 Canada
September 6, Ottawa: Russia 5–0 Finland

Semifinals
September 7, Philadelphia: Canada 3–2 Sweden (2OT)
September 8, Ottawa: Russia 2–5 United States

Finals
September 10, Philadelphia: Canada 4–3 United States (OT)
September 12, Montreal: United States 5–2 Canada
September 14, Montreal: Canada 2–5 United States

Statistics and awards

Tournament MVP
  Mike Richter

All-star team 
Goaltender:  Mike Richter
Defence:  Calle Johansson;  Chris Chelios
Forwards:  Brett Hull;  Mats Sundin;  John LeClair

Final standings

Top scorers

Leading Goaltender:  Curtis Joseph (2.31 GAA)

See also
 World Cup of Hockey
 List of international ice hockey competitions featuring NHL players
 2004 World Cup of Hockey
 International Ice Hockey Federation
 Summit Series
 National Hockey League

References

External links
Southam Newspapers' 1996 World Cup of Hockey page
Toronto Star's 1996 World Cup of Hockey page
Canoe Sports' 1996 World Cup of Hockey page
LCS Hockey's 1996 World Cup of Hockey page

 
World Cup of Hockey
1996–97 in American ice hockey
1996–97 in Canadian ice hockey
1996–97 in Czech ice hockey
1996–97 in Finnish ice hockey
1996–97 in German ice hockey
1996–97 in Russian ice hockey
1996–97 in Swedish ice hockey
August 1996 sports events
September 1996 sports events
Recurring sporting events established in 1996